The Silvanigrellaceae are the only family of the order Silvanigrellales, of the class Oligoflexia, of the phylum Pseudomonadota. This family currently harbors the two genera Silvanigrella and Fluviispira

Phylogeny
The currently accepted taxonomy is based on the List of Prokaryotic names with Standing in Nomenclature (LPSN) and National Center for Biotechnology Information (NCBI)

See also
 List of bacterial orders
 List of bacteria genera

References

External links
 Silvanigrella - List of Prokaryotic names with Standing in Nomenclature
 Fluviispira - List of Prokaryotic names with Standing in Nomenclature
 Silvanigrellaceae - NCBI Taxbrowser

Oligoflexia